Various genetic studies on Filipinos have been performed, to analyze the population genetics of the various ethnic groups in the Philippines.

The results of a massive DNA study conducted by the National Geographic's, "The Genographic Project", based on genetic testings of 80,000 Filipino people by the National Geographic in 2008–2009, found that the Philippines is made up of around 53% Southeast Asia and Oceania, 36% East Asian, 5% European, 3% South Asian and 2% Native American genes.

Origins

The first Austronesians reached the Philippines at around 2200 BC, settling the Batanes Islands and northern Luzon. From there, they rapidly spread downwards to the rest of the islands of the Philippines and Southeast Asia, as well as voyaging further east to reach the Northern Mariana Islands by around 1500 BC. They assimilated the older Negrito groups which arrived during the Paleolithic, resulting in the modern Filipino ethnic groups which all display various ratios of genetic admixture between Austronesian and Negrito groups.

A 2008 genetic study by Leeds University and published in Molecular Biology and Evolution, showed that mitochondrial DNA lineages have been evolving within Maritime Southeast Asia since modern humans arrived approximately 50,000 years ago. The authors concluded that it was proof that Austronesians evolved within Island Southeast Asia and did not come from Taiwan (the "Out-of-Sundaland" hypothesis). Population dispersals occurred at the same time as sea levels rose, which resulted in migrations from the Philippine Islands into Taiwan within the last 10,000 years.

However, these have been repudiated by a 2014 study published by Nature using whole genome sequencing (instead of only mtDNA) which has found that all ISEA populations had genes originating from the aboriginal Taiwanese. Contrary to the claim of a south-to-north migration in the "Out-of-Sundaland" hypothesis, the new whole genome analysis strongly confirms the north-to-south dispersal of the Austronesian peoples in the prevailing "Out-of-Taiwan" hypothesis. The researchers further pointed out that while humans have been living in Sundaland for at least 40,000 years, the Austronesian people were recent arrivals. The results of the 2008 study failed to take into account admixture with the more ancient but unrelated Negrito and Papuan populations.

Another study about the ancestral composition of modern ethnic groups in the Philippines from 2021 similarly suggests that distinctive Basal-East Asian (East-Eurasian) ancestry originated in Mainland Southeast Asia at ~50,000BC, and expanded through multiple migration waves southwards and northwards respectively. Basal-East Asian ancestry, as well as later Austroasiatic ancestry, from Mainland Southeast Asia, arrived into the Philippines prior to the Austronesian expansion. Austronesian-speakers themself are suggested to have arrived on Taiwan and the northern Philippines between 10,000BC to 7,000BC from coastal southern China. The authors concluded that the Austronesian expansion into Insular Southeast Asia and Polynesia was outgoing from the Philippines rather than Taiwan, and that modern Austronesian-speaking people have largely ancestry from the earliest Basal-East Asians, Austroasiatic migrants from Mainland Southeast Asia, and Austronesian-speaking seafarers from the Philippines. There was also a westward expansion of people from Papua New Guinea to the Philippines as evidenced by Papuan admixture in Blaan and Sangir peoples of Mindanao, as well as immigration from India as detected in the genetics of the Sama-Dilaut people.

Y-DNA haplogroups 

The most frequently occurring Y-DNA haplogroups among modern Filipinos are haplogroup O1a-M119, which has been found with maximal frequency among the indigenous peoples of Nias, the Mentawai Islands, northern Luzon, the Batanes, and Taiwan, and Haplogroup O2-M122, which is found with high frequency in many populations of East Asia, Southeast Asia, and Polynesia. In particular, the type of O2-M122 that is found frequently among Filipinos in general, O-P164(xM134), is also found frequently in other Austronesian populations, including Polynesians. Trejaut et al. 2014 found O2a2b-P164(xO2a2b1-M134) in 26/146 = 17.8% of a pool of samples of Filipinos (4/8 = 50% Mindanao, 7/31 = 22.6% Visayas, 10/55 = 18.2% South Luzon, 1/6 = 17% North Luzon, 2/22 = 9.1% unknown Philippines, 2/24 = 8.3% Ivatan). The distributions of other subclades of O2-M122 in the Philippines were sporadic, but it may be noted that O2a1b-JST002611 was observed in 6/24 = 25% of a sample of Ivatan and 1/31 = 3.2% of a sample from the Visayas, O2a2a1a2-M7 was observed in 1/6 = 17% of a sample from North Luzon, 1/55 = 1.8% of a sample from South Luzon, and 1/31 = 3.2% of a sample from the Visayas, and O2a2b1a1a-M133 was observed in 2/31 = 6.5% of a sample from the Visayas. A total of 45/146 = 30.8% of the sampled Filipinos were found to belong to Haplogroup O2-M122. In a study by Delfin et al. (2011), 21.1% (8/38) of a sample of highlanders of northern Luzon (17 Bugkalot, 12 Kalangoya, 6 Kankanaey, 2 Ibaloi, and 1 Ifugao) were found to belong to haplogroup O2a2a1a2-M7, which is outside of the O2a2b-P164 clade and is uncommon among Austronesian-speaking populations, being rather frequently observed among speakers of Hmong-Mien, Katuic, and Bahnaric languages in southwestern China and eastern Mainland Southeast Asia. (Delfin et al. also observed O-M7 in 5/39 = 12.8% of a sample of Agta from Iriga in southeastern Luzon and 5/36 = 13.9% of a sample of Ati from Panay.) Haplogroup O1a-M119 is also commonly found among Filipinos (25/146 = 17.1% O1a-M119(xO1a1a-P203, O1a2-M50), 20/146 = 13.7% O1a1a-P203, 17/146 = 11.6% O1a2-M50, 62/146 = 42.5% O1a-M119 total according to Trejaut et al. 2014) and is shared with other Austronesian-speaking populations, especially those in Taiwan, western Indonesia, and Madagascar.
R1b YDNA common in Spain and Western Europe was also detected among 12-13% of the sample size which had come to the area via immigration from Spain and Latin America, as well as L1 which came from Germanic Europeans and had spread to the Philippines from Anglo-America and consisting to about 0.95% of the sample size. Also included is Y-DNA H1a, that came from South Asian sources.

From Latin America/ Mexico and Peru 
There was migration of a military nature from Latin-America (Mexico and Peru) to the Philippines, composed of varying races (Amerindian, Mestizo and Castizo) as described by Stephanie J. Mawson in her book "Convicts or Conquistadores? Spanish Soldiers in the Seventeenth-Century Pacific". Also, in her dissertation paper called, ‘Between Loyalty and Disobedience: The Limits of Spanish Domination in the Seventeenth Century Pacific’, she recorded an accumulated number of 15,600 soldier-settlers sent to the Philippines from Latin-America during the 1600s. These 15,600 Latinos sent to the Philippines supplemented a population of only 667,612 people. Another 35,000 Mexican immigrants arrived in the 1700s and they were part of a Philippine population of 1.2 Million, forming about 2.91% of the population.

From Europe / Spain 
After the 16th century, the colonial period saw the influx of genetic influence from other populations. This is evidenced by the presence of a small percentage of the Y-DNA Haplogroup R1b present among the population of the Philippines. DNA studies vary as to how small these lineages are. A year 2001 study conducted by Stanford University Asia-Pacific Research Center stated that only 3.6% of the Philippine population had European Y-DNA. According to another genetic study done by the Kaiser Permanente (KP) Research Program on Genes, Environment, and Health (RPGEH), substantial number of Californian residents self-identifying as Filipinos sampled have "modest" amounts of European ancestry consistent with older admixture.

Mitochondrial DNA haplogroups

From India 
The Indian Mitochondrial DNA haplogroups, M52'58 and M52a are also present in the Philippines suggesting that there was Indian migration to the archipelago starting from the 5th Century AD.

The integration of Southeast Asia into Indian Ocean trading networks around 2,000 years ago also shows some impact, with South Asian genetic signals present within some Filipino ethnic groups like the Sama-Bajau communities.

See also 
Demographics of the Philippines
Peopling of Southeast Asia
Genetic history of East Asians

References

Phil
Modern human genetic history
Filipino people
Fil